An , also known as , is a 12-digit ID number issued to all citizens and residents of Japan (including foreign residents in Japan) used for taxation, social security and disaster response purposes. The numbers were first issued in late 2015.

Promotional campaign
To advertise the system's introduction the Japanese government employed actress Aya Ueto and created a mascot character name "Maina-chan".

Fraud
The first fraud related to the system occurred in 2015 when an elderly woman in the Kantō region was defrauded of several million yen.

Mainapoint
The Ministry of Internal Affairs and Communications is promoting a cashless payment card called Mainapoint (マイナポイント) linked to an individual's My Number. It is based on the My Key Platform, which had existed since 2017 but had failed to attract the population's interest.

See also
 Corporate Number (Japan)
 Social Security number
 National identification number

References

External links
 The Social Security and Tax Number System (Official introduction by the government)

National identification numbers
2015 establishments in Japan